Wilhelm "Willi" Evseev (born 14 February 1992) is a German professional footballer who plays as a midfielder for SV Meppen.

Career
Evseev was born in Kazakhstan but his family emigrated to Germany when he was an infant.

In April 2019, it was announced Evseev would be joining 3. Liga side SV Meppen from league rivals Hansa Rostock for the 2019–20 season. He agreed a two-year deal with Meppen.

References

External links

1992 births
Living people
People from Temirtau
Kazakhstani people of German descent
Kazakhstani people of Russian descent
Citizens of Germany through descent
German footballers
Germany youth international footballers
Association football midfielders
Kazakhstani footballers
Kazakhstani emigrants to Germany
German people of Kazakhstani descent
Bundesliga players
2. Bundesliga players
3. Liga players
Regionalliga players
Austrian Football Bundesliga players
Hannover 96 II players
Hannover 96 players
SC Wiener Neustadt players
VfL Wolfsburg II players
VfL Wolfsburg players
1. FC Nürnberg players
1. FC Nürnberg II players
Holstein Kiel players
FC Hansa Rostock players
SV Meppen players
Kazakhstani expatriate footballers
German expatriate footballers
German expatriate sportspeople in Austria
Expatriate footballers in Austria
German people of Russian descent